The Lake Magnan is a freshwater body located in the eastern part of Gouin Reservoir, in the territory of the town of La Tuque, in the administrative region of Mauricie, in the province of Quebec, in Canada.

Toponymy 
The current extent of Lake Magnan covers the former lakes: "Lake Asawewasenan", "Lake Assiwanan" and "Lake des Battures de Sable".

The toponym "Lac Magnan" was formalized on 18 December 1986 by the Commission de toponymie du Québec.

See also 
 Saint-Maurice River, a stream
 Oasis Island, an island

References 

Lakes of Mauricie
Gouin Reservoir